Married Life may refer to:

 Married Life (TV series)
 Married Life (1920 film), an American comedy film starring Ben Turpin
 Married Life (1921 film), a British drama film directed by Georges Tréville
 Married Love (film), a 1923 British drama film directed by Alexander Butler, also known as Married Life
 Married Life (2007 film), an American drama period film directed by Ira Sachs
 Married Life (novel), a novel written in Hebrew between 1927 and 1928 by Jewish novelist and poet David Vogel
 "Married Life", an instrumental from the opening sequence of the 2009 movie Up, composed by Michael Giacchino